The Houston Livestock Show and Rodeo, also called RodeoHouston or abbreviated HLSR, is the largest livestock exhibition and rodeo in the world. It includes one of the richest regular-season professional rodeo events. It has been held at NRG Stadium in Houston, Texas, since 2003, with the exception of 2021 due to the effects of the COVID-19 pandemic. It was previously held in the Astrodome. It is considered to be the city's "signature event", much like New Orleans's Mardi Gras, Dallas's Texas State Fair, San Diego's Comic-Con and New York City's New Year's Eve at Times Square.

In 2017, attendance reached a record high of 2,611,176 people and 33,000 volunteers. In 2007, the rodeo was deemed "the year of the volunteer." The event is 20 days long. It is kicked off by the Downtown Rodeo Roundup held near Houston City Hall, the Downtown Rodeo parade, and the ConocoPhillips Rodeo Run – a 10k and 5k walk & run and the World's Championship Bar-B-Que Contest. The show features championship rodeo action, livestock competitions, concerts, a carnival, pig racing, barbecue and the Rodeo Uncorked! International Wine Competition, shopping, sales and livestock auctions. Traditional trail rides, which start in different areas of Texas and end in Houston, precede the Rodeo events. The City of Houston celebrates this event with Go Texan Day, where residents are encouraged to dress in western wear the Friday before the rodeo begins.

The rodeo has drawn some of the world's biggest recording artists, including Gene Autry, Beyoncé, blink-182, Selena Gomez, Keith Urban, Ariana Grande, Selena, Reba McEntire, Kiss, Kelly Clarkson, Demi Lovato, Charley Pride, Elvis Presley, Bob Dylan, Alan Jackson, REO Speedwagon, Brooks & Dunn, George Strait, Janet Jackson, Garth Brooks, Willie Nelson, Kenny Chesney, Bon Jovi, ZZ Top, Chris Stapleton, John Legend, Taylor Swift, and Lynyrd Skynyrd, among others.

History

Early years
In the early part of the 20th century, Houston-area ranchers developed a new breed of cattle, the American Brahman, which was a blend of four breeds of cattle from India. The cattle were well-adapted to the hot, swampy conditions of the Texas Gulf Coast. In the early 1920s, James W. Sartwelle, a stockyard manager from Sealy, Texas, founded the American Brahman Breeders Association. Ranchers had no opportunities to show their cattle and raise awareness of the breed. Some attempted to show at the Southwestern Exposition and Livestock Show in Fort Worth, Texas, but they weren't allowed into the main arena.

In January 1932, Sartwelle invited six other businessmen to a lunch at the Texas State Hotel. They decided to host a livestock exposition in Houston.  Sartwelle was named the first president of the new Houston Fat Stock Show.  Their inaugural event was held in late April 1932 at Sam Houston Hall in downtown Houston. It was primarily a regional event, designed to showcase the agriculture and livestock, including Brahmans, in the area around Houston. The show lasted one week and ran a deficit of $2,800.  Approximately 2,000 people attended the exposition, where they were also entertained by the Future Farmers Band, comprising 68 high school students from around the state. The Grand Champion Steer was purchased by a local restaurant owner for $504.

The Fat Stock Show was held annually for the next four years. Realizing they had outgrown the space, organizers began looking for a larger venue.  Shortly after the 1936 show ended, Sam Houston Hall was torn down. Sam Houston Coliseum, a 10,000-seat arena, would take its place. To allow for construction time, the 1937 exposition was cancelled. The year off allowed Fat Stock show organizers to solidify plans for a larger event. When the show resumed in 1938, it included a parade through downtown Houston, a carnival and midway, and a rodeo with a total purse of $640.50.

In the 1940s, despite World War II, organizers added musical entertainment. Local talent was invited to perform after the rodeo on some evenings. In 1942, singing cowboy Gene Autry became the first nationally recognized entertainer to perform at the show.

Attendance flagged in the early 1950s. To attract more attention to the event, organizers decided to hold a cattle drive. In 1952, the media were invited to join cowboys on a  trek from Brenham, Texas to the Fat Stock Show. The publicity stunt was well received. The following year, the Salt Grass Trail Association again held the cattle drive. Other areas of the state organized their own trail rides to the show. This began the transition from a smaller regional event to larger, statewide notice.

Archer Romero, one of the key proponents of the trail ride, took over as president of the Fat Stock Show in 1954. That year, he founded the Go Texan Committee to further publicize the show. The committee would designate a day shortly before the show commenced as Go Texan Day. They encouraged Houston residents to dress in Western wear. The day had the dual purpose of celebrating Texas culture and advertising the show.

In 1957, Myrtis Dightman organized the first trail ride for African-Americans. He led 10 other cowboys in a ride from Prairie View, Texas to Houston. Because of their color, they were not welcomed in Memorial Park, where trail riders typically spent the night. Armed guards were there to ensure that the men could enter safely.

That same year, the show granted its first major scholarship. Ben Dickerson was given $2,000 ($16,000 in 2016) towards his education. This was the first step a major shift in the show's purpose. Over the next few decades, the show placed an increasing emphasis on education and scholarships.

Astrodome era
Throughout the 1950s, influential local leaders had been advocating that the city acquire a professional sports team. In 1957, the Texas State Legislature granted Harris County the ability to issue bonds to finance a new stadium, so that the city could attract a team. The county put together a commission to formulate a plan. Romero stepped down as Fat Stock Show president to join the commission. They visited stadiums in several large cities, as well as a fairgrounds in Oklahoma. After several years of research, the commission recommended that the county build both a stadium and a connected, air-conditioned coliseum. The presentation to the county commissioners listed four main uses for the new facility: 1) Major league baseball, 2) football, 3) the Fat Stock Show, and 4) various other activities.

County commissioners approved the project, sending it to a vote of Harris County residents. Just before the election, Fat Stock Show organizers announced that the show would donate  near South Main for the project, provided the show have input into the design. Voters approved the new stadium, and the Fat Stock Show became one of the focal residents of the new Astrodome. On March 1, 1970, Elvis Presley performed at the Houston Rodeo.

The show was renamed the Houston Livestock Show and Rodeo in 1961.  The show had continued to grow, and organizers realized that Sam Houston Coliseum would not be a viable alternative for much longer. The number of exhibitors had declined because many activities were held outside in tents. The chicken, rabbit, and hog shows were cancelled because organizers could not find space for them. Construction began on the Astrohall, next to the Astrodome, in 1965. The following year, the Livestock Show and Rodeo officially moved to the Astrodome. To mark their new location, the organizing committee introduced a new logo, the Bowlegged H. The first night of the rodeo featured entertainment by the stars of the television series Gunsmoke. Some locals scoffed at the idea that the rodeo and concert could fill a 45,000-seat stadium, but more than 40,000 fans attended the rodeo the night Jimmy Dean performed that year.

Louis Pearce Jr served sixty years as a board member of the Houston Livestock Show and Rodeo. He served on the executive committee as president and CEO, and remained an active executive committee member until his death in 2012. As a result of his dedication and significant contributions to the event, Pearce became known as "Mr. Houston Livestock Show".

The first Hispanic trail ride commenced in 1973. Calling themselves Los Vaqueros Rio Grande Trail Ride, the group journeyed  from the border crossing at Reynosa, Mexico to Houston.

The Go Texan committee launched the World's Championship Bar-B-Que Contest in 1974. Seventeen teams entered the competition, which was held in the Astrodome parking lot. The inaugural judges included actor Ben Johnson. The competition grew in popularity; by 1981 it had grown to over 200 teams, with 45,000 people visiting.

In 1988, the show added a 5k run and 10k fun run through downtown Houston. Participants would pay an entry fee, with proceeds going to the scholarship fund.

1990s
By the 1990s, the show had been expanded to 20 days. Each evening featured a rodeo, sanctioned by the Professional Rodeo Cowboys Association (PRCA). The rodeo offered hundreds of thousands of dollars in prize money, second only to the National Finals Rodeo. After the rodeo, attendees would see a concert, usually by a famous entertainer. Tickets were relatively inexpensive. For $10 or a little more, a person could buy a ticket to see the livestock shows, wild west shows, the rodeo and concert, and enjoy the carnival. The livestock show was billed as the largest of its kind, with more animals shown by adolescents than anywhere else in the country. Winning livestock were auctioned at the end of the judging, and, in the 1990s, the combined auction take was usually over $7 million. This was far beyond market value.

The rodeo was generally limited to the top PRCA contestants, based on prize money earned throughout the year. It was popular with cowboys; Houston won the inaugural Indoor Rodeo Committee of the Year award from the PRCA in 1992, and then won each of the next four years as well. The facility had huge screens hanging from the ceiling. Attendees could watch the competition live, then see an instant replay on the screens.

In 1996, the rodeo was halted one evening. The crew on the space shuttle Columbia appeared live on the big screens to address the crowd. Later that year, country singer George Strait set a record, having played to more than 1 million Houston rodeo attendees. The 1996 rodeo earned a net profit of $16.8 million and gave more than $7.9 million away in scholarships, assistantships, and research grants.

The Hideout was created in 1997 to give attendees more entertainment options after the rodeo and concert had ended. It is a nightclub for adults over 21 to dance and drink.

21st century
A new venue, Reliant Stadium (now NRG Stadium), was built on the Astrodome grounds in 2002. The rodeo marked its last night in the Astrodome on March 3, 2002, with a performance by country legend George Strait. The show was recorded and became Strait's first official live album, For the Last Time: Live from the Astrodome. Following the show, the Astrohall was torn down. A new exhibition space, Reliant Center, was constructed on the grounds, expanding exhibition capacity to 1.4 million square feet. Rodeo executives moved their offices into the second floor of the center. When the rodeo opened in 2003 in its new homes, Strait performed on opening night.  In the first two seasons at Reliant, the Hideout was cancelled, but it resumed in 2005, now located within the Astrodome.

In 2004, show organizers added a new event, Rodeo Uncorked! International. Vintners from around the world entered their wines into a competition. These were then auctioned, raising $313,700. The following year, the wine auction raised more than $500,000.  To give livestock show attendees the opportunity to taste the wines, the show launched the Wine Garden in 2008.

Attendance at the rodeo began falling. Attendees would purchase a ticket and arrive just before the concert, leaving a largely empty stadium for the rodeo itself. Joe Bruce Hancock, then the general manager of the rodeo, theorized that the audience was more urban and less familiar with rodeo events. The current show structure moved slowly and made it difficult for this type of audience to follow what was happening. As one of the PRCA-sanctioned rodeos, show organizers had little ability to make changes. The PRCA required that certain events be held, dictated the general structure of the rodeo, and insisted that each organizing committee use the PRCA national registration system. This meant that rodeos did not know which contestants were going to be appearing, or on which days.

The Houston rodeo committee requested a waiver from the PRCA in 2008. Houston would still remit 6% of the rodeo purse to the PRCA, but they would change the format and the registration system. Now, the rodeo knew who would be competing on which days and could market those individual appearances. The rodeo was restructured into a playoff format. Attendance at the rodeo skyrocketed.  Champion bareback rider Bobby Mote said competitors appreciated the changes: "It was exciting to be a part of because people were really getting into it. Finally we were performing for a real crowd in Houston."  The finale of the 2008 rodeo was the PRCA's Xtreme Bulls tour.  The same year, HLSR was inducted into the ProRodeo Hall of Fame along with 15 other PRCA rodeos that had previously been granted special recognition.

During the 2009 state legislative session, local state senator Mario Gallegos filed a bill that would require the livestock show organizing committee to comply with the state open records rules. The bill would also encourage the rodeo to contract with more minority-owned business and to add minorities to the livestock show's executive committee. At the time, the 19-member executive committee composed entirely of men, without a single Hispanic or African-American representative. Livestock show president Leroy Shafer insisted that the legislation was unprecedented, and that non-profits should not be held to the same standards as public entities. Shafer maintained that the executive committee membership was determined in large part by length of volunteer service, with the members having served, on average, for 37.5 years. According to Shafer, in time minorities and women would accumulate the years of service required to be on the committee. Minority leaders in Houston advocated a boycott. The controversy caused new Harris County sheriff Adrian Garcia to decline an invitation to be co-grand marshal of the rodeo parade, although Garcia still marched in the parade as part of the sheriff's office mounted patrol.

When the Astrodome was permanently closed in 2009, the Hideout moved to a giant tent on the grounds of the facility.

The rodeo's waiver from the PRCA expired in 2011. Houston applied for a renewal but were denied. The PRCA was under new management, who insisted that all of their rodeos should abide by the same rules. The show ended its contract with the organization, making the Houston Livestock Show and Rodeo an independent rodeo. As an unsanctioned rodeo, none of the prize money would count towards competitors' world standings, and thus qualification for the National Finals Rodeo. Some competitors were upset with the change, as winning the RodeoHouston $50,000 prize had generally been enough to qualify a cowboy for the National Finals Rodeo.  However, because the $1.75 million purse was the largest one in rodeo at that time, there was little difficulty in attracting cowboys. Because they were now independent, the show could now invite specific competitors who might not otherwise have qualified to appear, such as local cowboy, 8-time world champion calf roper Fred Whitfield.  Of the 280 competitors invited to attend in 2012, all but one accepted.

In an additional change, the rodeo dropped the PRCA's Xtreme Bulls tour from its last evening. As a replacement, they offered the Cinch RodeoHouston Super Shootout, inviting the champions from the top 10 rodeos in North America to compete in bull riding, saddle-bronc and bareback riding, and barrel racing.  Two of the rodeos represented, the Calgary Stampede and the Ponoka Stampede, were also non-PRCA sanctioned invitiational rodeos.   Total attendance in 2011 topped 2.26 million, an increase of almost 119,000 people over 2010.

In 2019 & 2020 and resuming in 2022, RodeoHouston has been  sanctioned by the PRCA again. The Super Series is PRCA-sanctioned and money won here by contestants counts toward the world standings for the National Finals Rodeo. However, the Super Shootout was unsanctioned and money won here did not count toward the PRCA world standings. Also in 2019, RodeoHouston won the PRCA Large Indoor Rodeo of the Year Award.

On March 11, 2020 after running for 8 of 20 planned days, the rodeo was shut down by the city of Houston after evidence emerged of community spread of the SARS-CoV-2 virus. The Montgomery County constable deputy in his 40s who tested positive for COVID-19 had attended a barbeque cookoff at the rodeo. The man was hospitalized and at least 18 rodeo attendees tested positive for coronavirus, though it is unclear whether they all contracted it at the event. It was the only time in the event's history the rodeo got shut down.

The 2021 edition of the rodeo was originally rescheduled to May due to the COVID-19 pandemic, but after several weeks, it was canceled altogether, making it the event's first cancellation in 84 years, with the 89th edition instead being deferred to 2022.

In the 2022 spring season, the Houston rodeo was officially reopened to the public, celebrating its second-highest attended record since 2017, with over 2.4 million reported guests in attendance.  An official 2023 season has currently been announced.

It was announced that as of 2023, the Super Shootout would no longer be a part of the rodeo.

Events

Rodeo Uncorked! RoundUp and Best Bites Competition
Almost 3,000 bottles of wine are submitted each year for judging in the Rodeo International Wine Competition.  High scoring wines are served to the public at the Rodeo Uncorked! RoundUp and Best Bites Competition before the HLSR begins. More than 5,000 people purchase tickets to attend the event. There, they can sample food from more than 100 local restaurants and vote on their pick for tastiest food.

During the livestock show, attendees can purchase glasses of these wine entries at the Wine Garden, an outdoor area comprising six tents that shelter 30,000 square feet of space. Live music is offered in the Wine Garden area each evening.

Go Texan Day
The unofficial kickoff of the Houston Livestock Show and Rodeo is Go Texan Day. Traditionally held the Friday before the rodeo begins, the day is meant to encourage the Houston community to celebrate Western culture. Houston-area residents are encouraged to wear Western attire, such as jeans, cowboy boots, and cowboy hats. The day is an unofficial holiday, and local school districts and many businesses encourage their students and employees to participate. Writing in The New York Times, journalist Manny Fernandez described Go Texan Day as ""the one day of the year on which people in Houston dress the way people outside Houston think people in Houston dress".

Trail rides
From 1952 to 2020 & resuming in 2022, traditional trail rides have been a part of the Houston Livestock Show and Rodeo. As of 2017, there were 13 official trail rides, totaling over 3,000 riders. The trail rides range in size from a dozen to over one thousand people who ride on horseback or in horse-drawn wagons from various areas of the state to Houston. Many of the routes take place in part along major highways and busy city streets, making safety a major concern.

The trail rides last from a few days to three weeks, depending on the distance they cover. Some of the participants are able to join only on weekends or at the end of the trip. The days start very early, and often end with live music or a small celebration. Many riders choose to camp in recreational vehicles rather than in the open. Each morning, they drive their vehicles and horse trailers to the next camping spot, then have a bus or convoy take them back so they can retrace their path on horseback. Participants can bring their own provisions, or, in some cases, purchase meals at a chuck wagon that is also following the trail.

The rides converge at Memorial Park in Houston on Go Texan Day, the Friday before the livestock show and rodeo begins.  The city closes some roads downtown to allow the riders to reach their destination safely. The resulting traffic interruption cause annual complaints from those who work downtown.  The following day, all of the trail riders participate in the parade.

Rodeo Parade and Rodeo Run
The official kickoff of the show is the annual Rodeo Parade. It is held the Saturday before the show begins and runs through downtown Houston.  The parade features members of the 13 trail rides, influential Houstonians, bands, and floats.

Preceding the parade is the annual Houston Livestock Show and Rodeo Run. More than 10,000 people compete annually in 5k and 10k fun runs. All proceeds go to the show's scholarship fund. The run generally begins near Bagby Street and ends at Eleanor Tinsley Park.

When the Rodeo was cancelled in 2021, the fun runs went virtual.

World's Championship Bar-B-Que Contest
The Thursday, Friday, and Saturday before the livestock show begins, the World's Championship Bar-B-Que Contest, established in 1974, is held on the grounds of NRG Park.  It is one of the largest barbecue cookoffs in the United States, but it is not sanctioned by the Kansas City Barbecue Society. More than 250 teams, including a handful from outside of the United States, compete to be named best entry in several categories, including brisket, chicken, and ribs.  The barbecue must be cooked on a wood fire; electric or gas fires are prohibited.

Entries are judged on a 50-point scale, with the most points gained for taste and tenderness, and lesser amounts available for smell and the look and feel of the entry.  Winners are named in each category, and then an overall Grand Champion is named.  Teams can also compete for non-food-related awards, such as cleanest area, most unique pit, and most colorful team.

Each barbecue team has their own tent on the grounds. Many offer their own entertainment, generally cover bands or djs. Entrance into each tents is by invitation only. Many teams sell sponsorships that provide access to their tent, with the money often going to charity. Attendees without an invitation to a specific tent can congregate in one of the three general admission areas, each with its own live entertainment.  A record 264,132 people attended the World's Championship Barbecue Contest in 2013.

The 49th is scheduled for 23–25 February 2023.

Rodeo and concert

One of the largest draws for the Houston Livestock Show and Rodeo is the 20 consecutive evenings of rodeo and concert, held in NRG Stadium.  Tickets are relatively inexpensive, averaging about $29 in 2016, and also grant admission to the livestock show and fairgrounds.  More than 43,000 season tickets are sold every year, with the remaining seats 30,000 seats available for individual-show sale.  Members of the HLSR are given an opportunity to buy individual tickets before the general public.

RodeoHouston is sanctioned by the Professional Rodeo Cowboys Association (PRCA). It offers one of the largest prize purses in North America, over $2 million, which count for the PRCA's  National Finals Rodeo. RodeoHouston features 280 of the top professional cowboys. They compete in a playoff format, with the ultimate champion in each event earning $50,000. For one day, contestants compete in the RodeoHouston SuperShootout. Champions from each of the top 10 rodeos in North America are invited to compete as teams in a subset of rodeo events. In 2020 & resuming in 2022, the entire rodeo has been televised live on The Cowboy Channel.

After the professional rodeo concludes, children are given an opportunity to compete. Each evening, 30 high school students from across the state compete in the calf scramble. They are given the opportunity to chase down (on foot) and catch one of 15 calves, put a halter on them, and drag them back to the center of the stadium. Winners are given money to purchase their own heifer or steer to show the following year.   Immediately following the calf scramble is mutton busting. Five- and six-year-olds wearing protective gear try to ride a sheep across a portion of the arena. On the last night of the rodeo, the winners from each of the previous evenings compete again to see who will become grand champion.

A rotating stage is then brought into the arena for the nightly concert. The majority of evenings are performances by country music singers, although several nights are dedicated to pop or rock music. The annual Go Tejano Day generally draws the largest crowds.  The winner of the annual Mariachi Invitational competition is invited to perform onstage with the Tejano acts.

Grounds
Visitors who are not attending the rodeo and concert can purchase a lower-cost general admission ticket to gain access to all of NRG Park except the stadium.

According to livestock show CEO Joel Cowley, "if we can draw people here for a concert or a carnival or a rodeo and teach them something about agriculture, it’s a win in regard to our mission."  NRG Center contains AgVenture, which provides educational displays about agriculture and the origins of the food for sale at grocery stores.  More than 61,000 schoolchildren visited AgVenture in 2015 on official tours.  Displays include an area where attendees can see cows, pigs, and sheep give birth or see chickens hatch.  There are also displays with live rabbits and honeybees.  NRG Center also hosts a large vendor area.

The grounds feature an area where children can do pretend farm chores and compete in races using pedal-driven tractors. There is also a petting zoo, pony and camel rides, and a full carnival and midway.  Over the course of the 20-day event in 2015, visitors purchased over $23 million of food outside of the stadium.

Other competitions are held throughout the three weeks at NRG Center and NRG Arena. These include open cattle shows and a paint horse competition. Children with mental and physical disabilities are invited to compete in the Lil' Rustlers Rodeo, which offers imitation rodeo events, such as riding a stick horse.

Free educational seminars are available throughout the three weeks of the livestock show. They are open to the public and cover topic related to wildlife, agricultural in general, and farming and hunting.

Adults can visit The Hideout, a temporary dance hall located in a large tent near NRG Arena. After the show in NRG Stadium concludes, The Hideout features live music from new artists. Several past performers at The Hideout, including the Dixie Chicks, Blake Shelton, Keith Urban, and the Eli Young Band, later became headliners at the main rodeo show. Approximately 2,000-3,000 people visit The Hideout each evening.

Livestock show
HLSR is the largest indoor livestock show in the world. For a full week, cattle auctions are held in NRG Arena for professional breeders to sell their stock. The livestock show has a larger international presence than any other. In 2017, the Ministers of Agriculture from Russia and Colombia made official visits to HLSR, joining more than 2,600 other international businessmen representing 88 countries. The HLSR International Committee estimated that they facilitated more than $2.6 million in agriculture sales between livestock show participants and international visitors in 2016.

Junior market auctions are also held. Children from around the state show the livestock that they have raised, including cows, pigs, goats, sheep, rabbits, and chicken. The livestock are judged, with the winners auctioned off.  It is the largest set of animals to be shown and judged of any livestock show.  Most champion animals sell for well over market value.  Winning children are guaranteed a certain amount of scholarship money; if the bid is larger than that amount, the excess funds are directed to the general scholarship fund.  More than 4,368 cattle were shown in 2017, with Brahmans the largest category.

Impact
HLSR is a 501(c)(3) charitable organization and ranks as the 7th-largest Better Business Bureau accredited charity in Houston.  Its primary source of revenue is an annual livestock show and rodeo and the events leading up to it. HLSR has 85 full-time employees and over 31,000 volunteers, divided into 108 committees.  The volunteers contribute an estimated 2.1 million hours of work per year, averaging almost 68 hours per person. All of them are required to pay a minimum fee of $50, and some committees require a larger donation. The most popular committees have a wait list.

More than 2.5 million people, including visitors from around the world, attended in 2016. It is the largest cultural event in Houston, and its attendance numbers dwarf those of annual attendance for most professional sports teams and most major cultural events in other cities. In comparison, New Orleans' Mardi Gras generally draws about 1.4 million visitors.

In 2015, the organization reported operating revenue of $133.35 million.  The Corral Club, which covers the sale of much of the alcohol on the grounds, but not that within the stadium, sold more alcohol in the three weeks of the HLSR than any other mixed-beverage permit holder in the state for the month of March 2016, and in the year prior was only outsold by the stadium where the Dallas Cowboys play.

A 2010 economic impact analysis estimate that the HLSR funneled $220 million into the Houston economy, with almost half of that coming from visitors outside of the Houston metro region. HLSR and its suppliers and vendors paid over $27 million in taxes to local entities. The study's author estimates that by 2017, the HLSR would be contributing almost $500 million to the local economy each year, the equivalent of hosting the Super Bowl every year.

HLSR awarded $26.07 million in scholarships, grants, and graduate assistantships in 2017. More than 750 students received scholarships, many of them worth $20,000 over four years. Recipients can pursue any field of study but are required to attend a university or college in Texas. Eleven different colleges were awarded funds to pay for graduate assistants. The remainder of the money was allocated for grants to other nonprofits or educational facilities to provide programs to help educate youth about agriculture or pioneer heritage.  Since 1932, HLSR boasts that it has given away over $430 million.

Milestones
 1931 : First established as The Houston Fat Stock Show.
 1932 : First Show is held at the Sam Houston Hall.
 1937 : No rodeo due to cancellation.
 1938 : Moved to new location: Sam Houston Coliseum.
 1942 : First star entertainer: Gene Autry, "the Singing Cowboy"; calf scramble event added to the Show's rodeo.
 1943–45 : No rodeo due to World War II.
 1946 : Rodeo resumes.
 1952 : First trail ride (Salt Grass Trail Ride) commences from Brenham, Texas.
 1957 : First major educational scholarship ($2,000) awarded to Ben Dickerson.
 1961 : Name changes to Houston Livestock Show and Rodeo.
 1963 : The School Art Program begins
 1966 : New location: Astrodome complex; Astrohall built for Livestock Exposition.
 1970 : Research program launched committing $100,000 annually in support of research studies at various universities and colleges in Texas
 1974 : The first World's Championship Bar-B-Que Contest. Elvis Presley sets attendance record of 43,944. On his second show, on the same day, he breaks his own record drawing 44,175, for a one-day record 88,119
 1975 : The Astroarena is completed.
 1977 : Four-year scholarships increased from $4,000 to $6,000.
 1983 : Four-year scholarships increased from $6,000 to $8,000.
 1989 : Scholarship program expands to Houston metropolitan area.
 1992 : Four-year scholarships upgraded from $8,000 to $10,000 retroactive to all students currently on scholarship.
 1993  : Tejano superstar Selena breaks attendance record at the Astrodome by drawing a crowd of exactly 57,894 fans.
 1994  : Tejano superstar Selena sets another attendance record at the Astrodome by drawing another crowd of 60,081 fans, breaking her previous record.
 1995  : Tejano superstar Selena holds famed Astrodome concert with over 67,000 fans, again, breaking her previous records
 1997 : Rodeo Institute for Teacher Excellence is created as a 3-year pilot program with $4.6 million in funding; websites www.hlsr.com and www.rodeohouston.com introduced.
 1998 : Number of 4-H and FFA scholarships increased to 60 per program, totaling 120 four-year $10,000 awards.
 1999 : Number of 4-H and FFA scholarships increased to 70 per program, totaling 140 four-year $10,000 awards; Opportunity Scholarships awarded based on financial need and academic excellence.
 2000 : Rodeo Institute for Teacher Excellence extended another 3 years with another $4.6 million; Reliant Energy acquires naming rights for the Astrodomain; renamed Reliant Park includes the Reliant Astrodome, Reliant Arena, Reliant Hall, Reliant Center and Reliant Stadium.
 2001 : Largest presentation of scholarships to date, with 300 four-year $10,000 awards through the Metropolitan, Opportunity and School Art scholarship programs, totaling $3 million.
 2002 : George Strait sets paid attendance record for any Rodeo event in the Reliant Astrodome with 68,266; Reliant Hall is demolished.
 2003 : New location: Reliant Stadium and Reliant Center; Carruth Plaza, a Western sculpture garden named in honor of past president and chairman, Allen H. "Buddy" Carruth, completed at Reliant Park.
 2006 : Brooks & Dunn break rodeo attendance record set by Hilary Duff in 2005 with 72,867 in attendance.
 2007 : The Cheetah Girls and supporting act Hannah Montana sell out in just three minutes and set a new rodeo attendance record of 73,291.
 2008 : Hannah Montana sets an attendance record of 73,459. 
 2008: Inducted into the ProRodeo Hall of Fame. 
 2009 : Ramón Ayala and Alacranes Musical set the all-time paid Rodeo attendance record on Go Tejano Day, with 74,147 in attendance for championship Rodeo action, concert entertainment and the Mariachi finals.
 2012 : The Professional Bull Riders held their first event at Reliant Stadium, and it was their first to be a part of RodeoHouston.
 2013 : George Strait, Martina McBride, and the Randy Rogers Band set a new all-time attendance record with 80,020.
 2015 : La Arrolladora Banda El Limón/La Maquinaria Norteña set a new all-time paid Rodeo attendance record on Go Tejano Day with 75,357.
 2016 : Banda Los Recoditos/Los Huracanes Del Norte broke the all-time paid Rodeo attendance record on Go Tejano Day with 75,508.
 2017 : Banda El Recodo/Banda Siggno broke the all-time paid Rodeo attendance record on Go Tejano Day with 75,557.
 2017 : Rodeo officials announced plans to replace the stage used in NRG Stadium for concerts with a new stage resembling that of a five point star. It can fold and it can be elevated or lowered so the performer can have a higher up stage or walk on the ground level. Garth Brooks is scheduled to be the first performer on the new stage.
 2018 : Garth Brooks kicked off and ended Livestock Show & Rodeo.
 2018 : Calibre 50 beat last year's all-time attendance record, as 75,565 fans showed up on Go Tejano Day. It was later broken by Garth Brooks, attended by 75,577.
 2018 : Cody Johnson becomes the first unsigned artist to play to a sold out crowd.
 2019 : Cardi B sets record, with 75,580 fans in the audience
 2019 : Los Tigres del Norte sets a new all-time attendance record a week later, with 75,586 fans in the audience, beating the previous artist record holder.
 2019 : George Strait breaks his own 2013 attendance record with 80,108 fans to close the 2019 show with Lyle Lovett and Robert Earl Keen opening. (two sets of attendance records are kept: one for shows with an accompanying rodeo competition, one for concert-only performances, in which seats are available on the floor of NRG stadium as well. Strait's record is the concert only, Los Tigres Del Norte holds the record for the rodeo/concert performances)
 2020 : RodeoHouston cancelled after 9 days when local spread of SARS-CoV-2 coronavirus caused cases of COVID-19.
 2021 : Rodeo went on hiatus for first time in 84 years.
 2022 : Rodeo returned after a pandemic-based one-year hiatus.

Notes

External links

 Houston Livestock Show and Rodeo Homepage
 Houston Livestock Show - Pro Rodeo Online

Rodeos
Culture of Houston
Concerts in the United States
Agricultural shows in the United States
Tourist attractions in Houston
ProRodeo Hall of Fame inductees
Rodeo venues in the United States
Animal shows